Visible Noise is a defunct British independent record label that focuses exclusively on British bands.

History
The label was founded in 1998 by former Cacophonous Records manager Julie Weir with the aim of promoting new British rock music and bringing it into the zeitgeist. According to Weir, at the time "everyone was paying way too much attention to American bands."

Visible Noise is known for bringing well-known British rock bands like Bring Me the Horizon, Bullet for My Valentine, and the now-defunct Lostprophets into the mainstream.

As of 2023, all signs indicate that the band has been inactive since 2017 (the official website and Facebook page are offline, there are no updates on Youtube, and there are no new releases).

Bands

Current bands
 The Dead Formats
 Blitz Kids

Former bands
 Bring Me the Horizon
 Bullet for My Valentine
 Oceans & Anchors
 Me vs Hero
 Outcry Collective
 The Plight
 Your Demise
 Goatsblood
 Ancient Ceremony
 Brides
 Burn Down Rome
 Cry For Silence
 Days of Worth
 Devil Sold His Soul
 Fireapple Red
 Kilkus
 Kill II This
 Labrat
 The Legac
 Lostprophets
 Miss Conduct
 Number One Son
 Opiate
 Primary Slave
 The Stupids

See also
 List of record labels
 List of independent UK record labels

References

External links
Official website
Official MySpace
Visible Noise on Rockmidgets.com
Interview with Julie Weir, HitQuarters, February 2009

Record labels established in 1998
1998 establishments in the United Kingdom
British independent record labels
Rock record labels
Heavy metal record labels
Hardcore record labels